Bălcești is a town located in Vâlcea County, Romania. The town administers eight villages: Benești, Cârlogani, Gorunești, Chirculești, Irimești, Otetelișu, Preoțești and Satu Poieni. It is situated in the historical region of Oltenia, at the south-western limit of the county, bordering on the Dolj and Olt counties.

Notable people
 Barbu Bălcescu
 Petrache Poenaru

References

Populated places in Vâlcea County
Towns in Romania
Localities in Oltenia